Francisco Villaruel Guilledo (August 1, 1901 – July 14, 1925), more commonly known as Pancho Villa, was a Filipino professional boxer. Villa, who stood only 5 feet and 1 inch (154 cm) tall and never weighed more than 114 pounds (51 kg), despite the racial discrimination of that time, rose from obscurity to become the first Asian to win the World Flyweight Championship in 1923, earning the reputation in some quarters as one of the greatest Flyweight boxers in history. He was never knocked out in his entire boxing career, which ended with his sudden death at only twenty-three from complications following a tooth extraction.

Early life and Philippine boxing career
Guilledo was born in Ilog, Negros Occidental, the son of a cowhand who abandoned his family when Guilledo was just six months old. He grew up in the hacienda of a wealthy local, helping his mother raise goats she tended on the farm.

When Guilledo was 11, he sailed to Iloilo City to work as a bootblack. While in Iloilo, he befriended a local boxer and together they migrated to Manila, settling in Tondo. He would occasionally spar with friends and soon attracted the attention of local boxing habitués. He fought his first professional fight in 1919 against Alberto Castro. Within two years, he was the Philippine Flyweight Champion, having dethroned Terio Pandong. He nearly gave up boxing after being spurned by a woman he courted, actually returning to Negros early in 1922 to retire. The clamor of Filipino boxing fans compelled him to return to the ring.

It appears that during this period, Guilledo was under the tutelage of at least two important local boxing figures. One was the American boxing promoter based in Manila, Frank E. Churchill. Another was a Filipino ice plant executive and boxing manager named Paquito Villa. The renaming of Francisco Guilledo to Pancho Villa has been attributed to both men, depending on the source. One version tags Churchill as having renamed Guilledo into Villa, taking the name from the Mexican guerrilla leader. Another version maintains that Paquito Villa had legally adopted Guilledo as early as 1918, renaming him Pancho.

Not long before coming to America, he met future American World Junior Lightweight Champion Mike Ballerino nine times in Manila between January 1920, and October 1921 defeating him in six bouts. Ballerino would also be managed by Frank Churchill after coming to America.

World Flyweight Champion

In May, 1922, Villa received an invitation from famed boxing promoter Tex Rickard to fight in the United States. He accepted the invitation and sailed to America together with Churchill and Paquito Villa. Upon arrival he was set up with a very young but talented sparring partner in Enrique Chaffardet and immediately won his first overseas fight against Abe Goldstein in Jersey City on June 7, 1922. He then fought and defeated by Frankie Genaro on August 22, 1922. By this time, Villa had caught the attention of boxing aficionados and he was slated to fight against the American Flyweight Champion Johnny Buff on September 15, 1922.

Villa defeated Buff in an upset, knocking out the champion in the 11th round to win the American Flyweight Championship. At this point, Villa had been in the American phase of his career for only 4 months. Villa lost the title early the following year to Genaro, who defeated the Filipino on points in a widely criticized decision. The unpopularity of Villa's defeat on points proved fateful. Jimmy Wilde, the Welsh-born boxer and former World Flyweight Champion, had decided to end his recent retirement and seek the then vacant World Flyweight Championship in a fight to be staged in America. While Genaro, the American Champion, seemed as the logical choice to fight Wilde, Villa's growing popularity soon convinced promoters that the Filipino would prove as the better draw.

In what were described in that era as "pre-battle statements," the 31-year-old Wilde said: ~"I appreciate the fact that in Villa, I am going to meet one of the toughest little men in boxing. I appreciate the fact that I am going to be put to a real test, and that is what I have prepared for."
In comments that summed up his fighting style, Villa said: ~"I am in condition and once in condition, my worries are over. I do not intend to give Wilde a minute's rest while we are in the ring."

Villa did not disappoint the ever pleasing crowd. On June 18, 1923, at the Polo Grounds in New York City, Villa was cheered on to victory over Wilde by more than 20,000 fans screaming "Viva Villa!" The win came by knockout in the 7th round, caused by a crashing right to Wilde's jaw. Villa was described as relentless, pummeling Wilde with both hands and causing the Welshman to also drop in the fourth and fifth rounds. Wilde never fought again.

His wife Gliceria (née Concepcion) who was left in Manila, asked by the media outfits for reaction had this to say: "You cannot imagine the happiness I felt upon receiving the first notices of the victory of my husband. I cried not because of pain but emotion. I was hoping for his triumph."

Former President General Emilio Aguinaldo, voicing the sentiment of the entire nation said: "Congratulations, Pancho, Come back to us and defend your title here."

A hero's welcome greeted Pancho when he disembarked from the "SS President Grant," the same luxury liner that brought him to the United States on April 2, 1922 to launch his campaign in the land of promise.

A reception at the Malacanan Palace hosted by then President Manuel Quezon followed a massive parade from the airport passing through Manila's major streets where thousands greeted the returning sports hero.

The new World Flyweight Champion successfully defended his title several times and never relinquished it until his death just two years later. Villa returned to a hero's welcome in Manila in September 1924, feted with a parade and a reception at Malacañan Palace. He also returned to his old haunts in Iloilo and his hometown in Negros Occidental. Before returning to the United States, he fought one more bout in Manila, against Clever Sencio, on May 2, 1925. Villa prevailed. None of the thousands of fans who saw that fight at Wallace Field knew that they had just witnessed Villa's final victory and the second to the last fight of his life.

Death

Villa returned to the United States to prepare for his next match, a non-title fight against Jimmy McLarnin scheduled for July 4, 1925, at Ewing Field in San Francisco. In the days leading to the fight, Villa's face became swollen due to an ulcerated tooth. According to contemporary newspaper accounts, on the morning of the fight, Villa went to a dentist to have the tooth extracted. Despite the pain and swelling, Villa insisted on going ahead with the fight with McLarnin. Villa ended up spending most of the fight using one hand to protect his afflicted face. Given these circumstances, Villa naturally lost, though he managed to stay the distance. It was to be Villa's last fight.

Two or three days after the McLarnin fight, he had three more teeth extracted after an infection was discovered. Against his dentist's prescription of bed rest, Villa spent the next few days carousing with friends. His condition worsened, and by July 13, 1925, he had to be rushed to the hospital. It was discovered that the infection had spread to his throat, resulting in Ludwig's angina. Villa was rushed into surgery, but he lapsed into a coma while on the table and died the following day, July 14, 1925, 17 days before his 24th birthday.

His remains were returned to Manila, and in August 1925, he was buried at Manila North Cemetery.

Family
His younger half-brother, Eulogio Villaruel Tingson also known as "Little Pancho", was a professional boxer who compiled a record of 103(19 KO)–18–26 with 1 No Contest.

Honors
Villa's 1923 victory made him the first Asian in history to have won an international boxing championship. In October 1961, Villa was added by Ring Magazine to its own boxing hall of fame. He was inducted belatedly into the International Boxing Hall of Fame in 1994, the second Filipino boxer so honored after Gabriel "Flash" Elorde, who was born nearly a decade after Villa's death.

Villa was ranked the 59th best fighter by Ring Magazine in 2002 in a list of the 80 Best Fighters of the Last 80 Years.

He was voted as the #1 flyweight (along with Miguel Canto) of the 20th century by the Associated Press in 1999.

Professional boxing record
All information in this section is derived from BoxRec, unless otherwise stated.

Official record

All newspaper decisions are officially regarded as “no decision” bouts and are not counted in the win/loss/draw column.

Unofficial record

Record with the inclusion of newspaper decisions in the win/loss/draw column.

Boxing Hall of Fame

Filipino Hall of Fame Boxers

See also 

 List of flyweight boxing champions
 List of Filipino Boxing World Champions

References

External links 

Francisco "Pancho Villa" Guilledo – IBHOF Biography

The forgotten story of... the man who sought revenge for Jimmy Wilde Article covering the Pancho Villa-Frankie Ash fight.
Francisco Guilledo – CBZ Profile

|-

 
https://titlehistories.com/boxing/wba/wba-world-fl.html
https://titlehistories.com/boxing/na/usa/ny/nysac-fl.html

1901 births
1925 deaths
Boxers from Negros Occidental
Burials at the Manila North Cemetery
Filipino male boxers
Flyweight boxers
International Boxing Hall of Fame inductees
People from Tondo, Manila
Visayan people
World boxing champions
World flyweight boxing champions
Philippine Sports Hall of Fame inductees